Expedition 48 was the 48th expedition to the International Space Station.

Jeffrey Williams, Aleksey Ovchinin and Oleg Skripochka transferred from Expedition 47. Expedition 48 began upon the departure of Soyuz TMA-19M in 18 June 2016 and concluded upon the departure of Soyuz TMA-20M on September 6, 2016. The crew of Soyuz MS-01 were transferred to Expedition 49.

Crew

EVA performed

References

External links

 NASA's Space Station Expeditions page

Expeditions to the International Space Station
2016 in spaceflight